Horbach may refer to:

Places
Horbach, Bad Kreuznach, a municipality in the district of Bad Kreuznach, Rhineland-Palatinate, Germany
Horbach, Südwestpfalz, a municipality in the district Südwestpfalz, Rhineland-Palatinate, Germany
Horbach, Westerwaldkreis, a municipality in the district Westerwaldkreis, Rhineland-Palatinate, Germany

Other uses
Horbach (surname)